The Convention on Early Notification of a Nuclear Accident is a 1986 International Atomic Energy Agency (IAEA) treaty whereby states have agreed to provide notification of any nuclear accident that occur within its jurisdiction that could affect other states. It, along with the Convention on Assistance in the Case of a Nuclear Accident or Radiological Emergency, was adopted in direct response to the April 1986 Chernobyl disaster.

By agreeing to the Convention, a state acknowledges that when any nuclear or radiation accident occurs within its territory that has the potential of affecting another state, it will promptly notify the IAEA and the other states that could be affected. The information to be reported includes the incident's time, location, and the suspected amount of radioactivity release.

The Convention was concluded and signed at a special session of the IAEA general conference on 26 September 1986; the special session was called because of the Chernobyl disaster, which had occurred five months before. Significantly, the Soviet Union and the Ukrainian SSR—the states that were responsible for the Chernobyl disaster—both signed the treaty at the conference and quickly ratified it. It was signed by 69 states and the Convention entered into force on 27 October 1986 after the third ratification.

As of 2021, 115 state parties are full participants in the Convention, along with the European Atomic Energy Community, the Food and Agriculture Organization, the World Health Organization, and the World Meteorological Organization. A further 8 states have signed the treaty but not ratified it - Afghanistan, Democratic Republic of the Congo, Holy See, Niger, North Korea, Sierra Leone, Sudan, and Zimbabwe.

See also
European Community Urgent Radiological Information Exchange

References

External links
Convention on Early Notification of a Nuclear Accident, IAEA information page.
Text of the Convention.
Signatures and ratifications.

1986 in Austria
Aftermath of the Chernobyl disaster
International Atomic Energy Agency treaties

Treaties concluded in 1986
Treaties entered into force in 1986
Treaties of Albania
Treaties of Algeria
Treaties of Angola
Treaties of Argentina
Treaties of Armenia
Treaties of Australia
Treaties of Austria
Treaties of Bahrain
Treaties of Bangladesh
Treaties of the Byelorussian Soviet Socialist Republic
Treaties of Belgium
Treaties of Bolivia
Treaties of Bosnia and Herzegovina
Treaties of Botswana
Treaties of Brazil
Treaties of Burkina Faso
Treaties of Cambodia
Treaties of Cameroon
Treaties of Canada
Treaties of Chile
Treaties of the People's Republic of China
Treaties of Colombia
Treaties of Costa Rica
Treaties of Croatia
Treaties of Cuba
Treaties of Cyprus
Treaties of the Czech Republic
Treaties of Czechoslovakia
Treaties of Denmark
Treaties of the Dominican Republic
Treaties of Egypt
Treaties of El Salvador
Treaties of Estonia
Treaties of Finland
Treaties of France
Treaties of Gabon
Treaties of Georgia (country)
Treaties of West Germany
Treaties of East Germany
Treaties of Greece
Treaties of Guatemala
Treaties of Iceland
Treaties of India
Treaties of Indonesia
Treaties of Iran
Treaties of Ba'athist Iraq
Treaties of Ireland
Treaties of Israel
Treaties of Italy
Treaties of Japan
Treaties of Jordan
Treaties of Kazakhstan
Treaties of South Korea
Treaties of Kuwait
Treaties of Laos
Treaties of Latvia
Treaties of Lebanon
Treaties of Lesotho
Treaties of the Libyan Arab Jamahiriya
Treaties of Liechtenstein
Treaties of Lithuania
Treaties of Luxembourg
Treaties of Malaysia
Treaties of Mali
Treaties of Mauritania
Treaties of Mauritius
Treaties of Mexico
Treaties of Monaco
Treaties of Montenegro
Treaties of Morocco
Treaties of Mozambique
Treaties of Myanmar
Treaties of the Netherlands
Treaties of New Zealand
Treaties of Nicaragua
Treaties of Nigeria
Treaties of Norway
Treaties of Oman
Treaties of Pakistan
Treaties of Panama
Treaties of Paraguay
Treaties of Peru
Treaties of the Philippines
Treaties of Portugal
Treaties of Qatar
Treaties of Moldova
Treaties of Romania
Treaties of the Soviet Union
Treaties of Saint Vincent and the Grenadines
Treaties of Saudi Arabia
Treaties of Senegal
Treaties of Serbia and Montenegro
Treaties of Singapore
Treaties of Slovakia
Treaties of Slovenia
Treaties of South Africa
Treaties of Spain
Treaties of Sri Lanka
Treaties of Sweden
Treaties of Switzerland
Treaties of Tajikistan
Treaties of Thailand
Treaties of North Macedonia
Treaties of Tunisia
Treaties of Turkey
Treaties of the Ukrainian Soviet Socialist Republic
Treaties of the United Arab Emirates
Treaties of the United Kingdom
Treaties of Tanzania
Treaties of the United States
Treaties of Uruguay
Treaties of Venezuela
Treaties of Vietnam
Treaties entered into by the European Atomic Energy Community
Treaties of Yugoslavia
Treaties extended to the Faroe Islands
Treaties extended to Greenland
Treaties extended to Aruba
Treaties extended to the Netherlands Antilles
Convention on Early Notification of a Nuclear Accident
Treaties entered into by the World Health Organization
Treaties entered into by the Food and Agriculture Organization
Treaties entered into by the World Meteorological Organization